Loxoporetes is a genus of spiders in the family Thomisidae. It was first described in 1911 by Kulczyński. , it contains 2 species from Australia and New Guinea.

References

Thomisidae
Araneomorphae genera
Spiders of Australia
Spiders of Asia